Mark Peters is a former American soccer player.

Club career
After leaving the University of Virginia, where he had been named ACC Men's Soccer Tournament MVP in 1994, Peters spent seven months in Costa Rica with Alajuelense, before returning to the United States to play in the A-League.

Career statistics

Club

Notes

References

Date of birth unknown
Living people
University of Virginia alumni
American soccer players
Association football goalkeepers
Virginia Cavaliers men's soccer players
A-League (1995–2004) players
Hershey Wildcats players
North Carolina Fusion U23 players
American expatriate soccer players
American expatriate sportspeople in Costa Rica
Expatriate footballers in Costa Rica
Year of birth missing (living people)